Vatu Vara Island is a Fijian island in the northwest sector of the Lau Group of islands.

Geography

On the northern and eastern edges of the island the sea breaks against the limestone cliffs, which are deeply undercut; but elsewhere the island is circled by a broad fringing reef, which, off the western coast swings sharply away from the shore to enclose the lagoon. The precipitous sides of the central mass are scored by three shallow terraces, marking pauses in the uplift of the island; but these are not readily observed, being smothered under the dense vegetation that clothes the whole towering structure.

The island is a former atoll, specifically called a “Guyot”. This is an extinct volcano that has become overgrown by coral reefs to form an atoll. The flat top was once at sea level, hence the flat summit.

The island is privately owned by James Jannard.

Vakatawa kei Vatuvara (Guardian of Vatuvara)

The traditional mythical guardian of Vatu Vara is a sea goddess (or nymph) named Sakulawe. In Yadrana, Lakeba, the Turaga Vaka family have one of their elderly matriarch named after Sakulawe, as a token of respect to one of their late blood relatives and a chief of Vuna: Ratu Masiwini; Masiwini is the great-grandfather of current Fiji National Provident Fund CEO Aisake Taito, married to the daughter of Ratu Sir Kamisese Mara.

See also

 Desert island
 List of islands

References

Uninhabited islands of Fiji
Lau Islands
Private islands of Fiji